Nepali Lok Katha is a Nepali-language folk tales collection by Tulasi Diwasa. It was published in 2031 BS (1974 -1975 CE) by Nepali Rajakiya Pragya Pratisthan. It consists of folktales form various regions and languages across Nepal. 

The book has been used as a source of folklores in various universities in Nepal.

Background 
The book was first published on 2031 BS by Nepal Academy. It was later published with additional stories on February 17, 2021 by Book Hill Publication. The book consists of 122 folktales collected from various regions, languages, castes and cultures of Nepal. The book had taken more than a decade to complete during Panchayat rule in Nepal.

See also 

 Karnali Lok Sanskriti
 Nepalese folklore
 Hamro Lok Sanskriti
 Limbuwanko Etihasik Dastavej Sangraha

References 

Nepalese books
20th-century Nepalese books
Nepalese culture
Nepalese short story collections
Nepali short story collections
Nepali-language books
Nepalese folklore
Collections of fairy tales